This is an incomplete list of manuscripts written in the Glagolitic script. For printed works see List of Glagolitic books. For inscriptions see List of Glagolitic inscriptions.

900-999

1000-1099

1100-1199

1200-1299

1300-1399

1400-1499

1500-1599

1600-1699

1700-1799

1800-1899

1900-1999

Undated

See also

 Church Slavonic language
 List of Glagolitic books
 List of Glagolitic inscriptions

References

Literature

 Verkholantsev, Julia: The Slavic Letters of St. Jerome: The History of Legend and Its. Legacy, Cornell University Press, Ithaca, New York 2014.
 Bakmaz, Ivan: "Biblijska čitanja u hrvatskoglagoljskim brevijarima" in Glagoljica i hrvatski glagolizam. Zbornik radova s međunarodnoga znanstvenog skupa povodom 100. obljetnice Staroslavenske akademije i 50. obljetnice Staroslavenskog instituta. pages 139-149. Zagreb-Krk 2004.
 Kolanović, Josip and Obhođaš, Amir: Zbirka mikrofilmova glagoljskih rukopisa i isprava, Zagreb 2006.
 Vajs, Josef: Nejstarší breviář charvatsko-hlaholský, Prague 1910.
 Vajs, Josef: Rukovet Hlaholske Paleografie., Prague 1932.
 Václav Hanka: O ostatcích slovanského bohoslužení v Čechách., Prague 1859.
 

 
Literature lists
Medieval manuscripts
Old Church Slavonic literature
Glagolitic script
Slavic manuscripts